The Atlas District (also known as the Atlas  or the H Street Corridor) is an arts and entertainment district located in the Near Northeast neighborhood of Washington, DC. It runs along the resurgent H Street from the outskirts of Union Station to the crossroads with Fifteenth Street, Bladensburg Road, and Florida Avenue (also known as the "Starburst Intersection"). The name "Atlas District" is not historical. It is part of a neighborhood branding campaign built around the revitalized Atlas Theater.

The area suffered economic setbacks after the riots following Martin Luther King, Jr.’s 1968 assassination. The neighborhood began a resurgence after Joe Englert announced plans in 2005 to transform this three block area with various bars and music venues. Examples of bars that he opened were: the Pug; the Red and Black; the Rock N Roll Hotel; the Bee Hive; the Olympic, a sports bar with pool tables; Dr. Granville Moore's Brickyard; and the Showbar. Additionally, the area has benefited from the economic resurgence that has affected most of the district since the turn of the 21st century.

The area is served by the X2 Metrobus. The city's streetcar system runs along H Street from Union Station to Benning Road, passing through the Atlas District.

The Atlas Theater, the district's namesake, was originally built in 1938. It was converted into the Atlas Performing Arts Center in 2001. The marquee and external appearance of the original movie theater were preserved, but the inside was completed replaced. The building now houses rehearsal and performance space for local performing arts groups, including the Capital City Symphony.

References

External links
 AtlasDistrict.com
 AtlasArts.org
 CapitalCitySymphony.org

Entertainment districts in the United States
Neighborhoods in Northeast (Washington, D.C.)
Northeast (Washington, D.C.)